Obasan and obāsan are Japanese words meaning 'grandmother' or 'older woman' respectively, sometimes found in English in anime and manga.  They may also mean:

 Obasan, a novel by Joy Kogawa, published in 1981
 A popular royal lineage name in Yoruba ethnic group in the South Western part of Nigeria which is translated from the local Ijebu dialect as "it pays to be a king".